Ismael Morandini; (July 6, 1978 – August 25, 2010) was an Argentine playwright and theatre actor. He acted in twenty plays, usually in or around Catamarca and Tucumán. He was part of the "Iron Maider" troupe created by Sebastian Mancilla Olivares. In 1996, at age eighteen, he starred alongside Juliana Reyes, Az Martínez and Lu Rodriguez in La Enfermedad Incurable. He was considered one of the best playwrights and actors of his province.

Early life 
Morandini was born on July 14, 1978 in Aguilares, Tucumán. He had an upper class upbringing by virtue of being the only child of a lawyer and a doctor. He showed acting skills from a young age, portraying popular characters during his elementary school years.

Career 

Morandini portrayed Manuel, a boy haunted by ghosts, in Imanol Berrio's Razas Misteriosas (Strange Races). After Razas Misteriosas, he starred in Nunca Me Dan Para Comer (They Never Give Me Enough Money To Eat) under the same director and was honored for his portrayal of Horacio, a bulimic boy who changes his way of life after the death of his parents. Morandini pursued a career in theatre after college, but changed his plans after relocating to San Fernando del Valle de Catamarca, Catamarca, where he joined Chilean director Sebastian Mancilla Olivares's theatre troupe. Morandini then starred in La Enfermedad Incurable as the character of Juan Marchetti. He later established his own theatre troupe, named "The Horace: Con Mucha Onda".

Death 

In mid-2009, Ismael was involved in a car accident that took his life in Tucumán, Catamarca. He spent a week in the hospital before passing.

Body of Work

Playwright 

1990 — Simplemente me gustas
1991 — Lizzie, es una monja
1991 — Por favor ámame
2001 — Caretas, sínicos, hipócritas… todos son geniales

Trivia 

Members of The Horace: con mucha onda go on tour across Argentine and perform the works of the group's founder.

References

1978 births
2010 deaths
Argentine male actors